Juazeiro Social Clube, usually known as Juazeiro is a Brazilian football club from Juazeiro, Bahia state.

History
On August 16, 1995, Juazeiro Social Clube was founded as a professional club after eight amateur clubs, América, Barro Vermelho, Carranca, Colonial, Grêmio, Olaria, XV de Novembro and Veneza, merged.

In 1996, Juazeiro won its first title, which was the Campeonato Baiano Second Level.

In 2001, the club finished as Bahia State Championship runner-up, after being defeated by Bahia in the final.

Achievements
 Campeonato Baiano Second Level: 1996, 2010
 Torneio do Interior: 2003

Stadium
Juazeiro's stadium is Estádio Adauto Morais, with a maximum capacity of 12,000 people.

References

External links
 Juazeiro Social Clube at Arquivo de Clubes

 
Association football clubs established in 1995
Football clubs in Bahia
1995 establishments in Brazil
Juazeiro